Pogogyne nudiuscula is a rare species of flowering plant in the mint family known by the common name Otay mesa mint. It is native to southern San Diego County, California, where it is known only from Otay Mesa near the border with Baja California. It was identified on land south of the Mexican border, but these occurrences have probably been extirpated. It is now known from seven vernal pool complexes just north of the border, and it is a federally listed endangered species of the United States.

This annual herb produces an erect stem reaching 30 centimeters in maximum height. Its herbage is strongly aromatic and coated very thinly with stiff hairs, or lacking hairs. The inflorescence is an interrupted series of flower clusters. The flowers are just over a centimeter long, bell-shaped with narrow throats, and bright purple in color, usually with some white on the lower lip.

This plant faces a number of threats related to the loss and destruction of habitat containing its rare vernal pool ecosystem. These threats include urban development, trash dumping and pollution, vehicles, fire, grazing, and alterations in the local hydrology.

References

External links
Jepson Manual Treatment
USDA Plants Profile
Photo gallery

nudiuscula
Endemic flora of California
Natural history of the California chaparral and woodlands
Natural history of San Diego County, California
Plants described in 1876